Governor Montgomerie may refer to:

James Montgomerie (1755–1829), Acting Governor of Demerara from 1805 to 1808 and Governor of Dominica in 1808
John Montgomerie (died 1731), Colonial Governor of New York and New Jersey from 1728 to 1731